Birkaland (Swedish for Pirkanmaa) is the name of a geographical region in Finland which can refer to:

Pirkanmaa, a current Region of Finland
Satakunta (historical province) - a historical Province of Sweden that covered much of modern Pirkanmaa